The Mjøsa Bridge is a box girder bridge that crosses Lake Mjøsa in Innlandet county, Norway. The east side of the bridge begins in the town of Moelv in Ringsaker Municipality and the village of Biri in Gjøvik Municipality. The bridge has 21 spans and one vehicular lane in each direction. The Mjøsa Bridge was opened in 1985. 

The government is currently planning to replace the bridge with a new four-lane bridge over the lake as part of an expansion of the E6 highway around Moelv. Work (or construction) on the (new, wooden) bridge has been paused as of Q3 2022, as a consequence of the 2022 collapse of the Tretten Bridge in Norway.

See also
List of bridges in Norway
List of bridges in Norway by length
List of bridges
List of bridges by length

References

External links
A picture of the bridge
Another picture of the bridge

Bridges in Innlandet
Bridges completed in 1985